

This is a list of the National Register of Historic Places listings in Center City, Philadelphia.

This is intended to be a complete list of the properties and districts on the National Register of Historic Places in Center City in Philadelphia, Pennsylvania, United States. The locations of National Register properties and districts for which the latitude and longitude coordinates are included below, may be seen in an online map.

There are 567 properties and districts listed on the National Register in Philadelphia, including 67 National Historic Landmarks. Center City includes 148 of these properties and districts, including 34 National Historic Landmarks; the city's remaining properties and districts are listed elsewhere. Ten historic districts cover almost half of Center City including essentially all the area between the Schuylkill and Delaware Rivers from Chestnut Street on the north to Locust Street on the south. Five other properties in Center City were once listed but have been removed.

Current listings

|}

Former listings

|}

See also
 List of National Historic Landmarks in Philadelphia
 National Register of Historic Places listings in Philadelphia, Pennsylvania
 Philadelphia Register of Historic Places

References

Buildings and structures in Philadelphia
Center City
Center City, Philadelphia